The first Documenta took place between 15 July and 18 September 1955 in Kassel, West Germany. The artistic director was Arnold Bode.  It was considered the largest and most extensive exhibition of modern art in West Germany since the end of the Second World War.

Participants

References 

Documenta 1
1955 in Germany
1955 in art